New Mexico Airlines was an American commuter airline brand founded by Pacific Air Holdings to operate flights in New Mexico after the airline was awarded an Essential Air Service contract to serve Hobbs and Carlsbad, New Mexico. The airline started flights on July 1, 2007, and uses the airline identifiers and call signs of its parent company Pacific Wings. Despite having "New Mexico" in the name, the brand was actually headquartered in Mesa, Arizona, in metropolitan Phoenix.

Previous destinations

Alamogordo, New Mexico (Alamogordo-White Sands Regional Airport)
Midland, Texas / Odessa, Texas
Los Alamos, New Mexico (Los Alamos County Airport)(Contract Terminated as of January 23, 2015)
Ruidoso, New Mexico (Sierra Blanca Regional Airport) 
Santa Fe, New Mexico (Santa Fe Municipal Airport)
El Paso, Texas (El Paso International Airport)
Hobbs, New Mexico (Lea County Regional Airport)
Albuquerque, New Mexico (Albuquerque International Sunport)
Carlsbad, New Mexico (Cavern City Air Terminal)

Fleet
As of December 2014, the New Mexico Airlines fleet consisted of the following aircraft:

See also 
 List of defunct airlines of the United States

References

External links

New Mexico Airlines

Defunct airlines of the United States
Airlines established in 2007
Airlines disestablished in 2015
Airlines based in Arizona